Progress is an urban locality (a work settlement) in Amur Oblast, Russia, located southeast of Blagoveshchensk, the administrative center of the oblast. Population:

Administrative and municipal status
Within the framework of administrative divisions, it is, together with the work settlement of Novoraychikhinsk and one rural locality (the settlement of Kivdinsky), incorporated as Progress Urban Okrug—an administrative unit with the status equal to that of the districts. As a municipal division, this administrative unit also has urban okrug status.

References

Notes

Sources

Urban-type settlements in Amur Oblast
 
